Cinesite Vancouver (formerly known as Nitrogen Studios Canada, Inc., commonly referred to as Nitrogen Studios) is a Canadian animation company founded by husband and wife duo Greg Tiernan and Nicole Stinn. The company was founded in October 2003, in Vancouver, British Columbia.

Cinesite Vancouver was best known for animating the long-running British television series Thomas & Friends, which first began in the 12th season in 2008. The show was still using models up until 2009, and Nitrogen Studios would animate CGI faces onto the models using tracking tools. The company would later take over for full computer-animation in 2009 with the 13th season, and followed with seasons 14, 15 and 16, before Arc Productions (now Jam Filled Entertainment) took over in the animation department. Along with animating the 4 seasons, came 4 feature-length specials, including Hero of the Rails (2009), Misty Island Rescue (2010), Day of the Diesels (2011), and Blue Mountain Mystery (2012). Greg served as a unit director, and Nicole served as a unit producer. All seasons and films were co-produced with HIT Entertainment.

Nitrogen had also provided CGI animation and concept art for a planned second theatrical Thomas & Friends film with the title The Adventures of Thomas.

Before animating Thomas & Friends, they animated the 2006 CGI family comedy film Happily N'Ever After, distributed by Lionsgate, and co-produced with Odyssey Entertainment and Vanguard Animation, only for it to perform as a box office flop, earning $37 million on a $47 million budget. In 2016, Greg Tiernan, along with Conrad Vernon, directed the highest-grossing R-rated CGI adult comedy film, Sausage Party, distributed by Columbia Pictures, co-produced with Annapurna Pictures and Point Grey, earning $140 million on a $19 million budget.

Greg and Conrad then produced and directed The Addams Family (2019), a film co-produced by Metro-Goldwyn-Mayer, The Jackal Group, and Bron Creative, distributed by United Artists Releasing in the US, and Universal Pictures internationally, and The Addams Family 2 (2021), a film co-produced by Metro-Goldwyn-Mayer, BermanBraun, Glickmania, and Bron Creative, distributed by United Artists Releasing in the US, and Universal Pictures internationally. The Addams Family earned $203 million on a $24 million budget, and The Addams Family 2 earned $110 million on a $47 million budget.

For television, they also produced Dan Vs., an American animated television series created by Dan Mandel and Chris Pearson, produced by Film Roman and The Hatchery, and distributed by Starz Distribution. They provided lip-sync for 27 episodes, spanning from February 26, 2011, to June 23, 2012. They animated two episodes of the Netflix series Trollhunters, co-produced with DreamWorks Animation and Double Dare You, with the first airing on December 23, 2016, and the 2nd airing on May 25, 2018.

The company's other projects are God of War, a 2005 action-adventure game developed by Santa Monica Studio, and published by Sony Computer Entertainment, Sonic Chronicles: The Dark Brotherhood, a 2008 role-playing game developed by BioWare, published by Sega for the Nintendo DS, and Kodee's Canoe, a 2010 interactive app series.

On March 7, 2017, it was acquired by British visual effects and feature animation studio company Cinesite, becoming their Vancouver operations.

Filmography

Feature films

Theatrical

Direct-to-Video

Television

Other projects

Controversy
Several days after the release of Sausage Party, allegations of poor treatment of Nitrogen Studios employees surfaced in the comments section of an interview with Tiernan and co-director Conrad Vernon, featured on the website Cartoon Brew. Various anonymous posters, purporting to be animators who worked on the film in question, made claims including that Nitrogen forced them to work overtime for free and that some employees were threatened with termination. Some animators who complained or left due to stress went uncredited in the film. One poster stated that Tiernan had developed a reputation for "disturbing behaviour and abusive management style". Publications such as the Washington Post the Los Angeles Times and /Film have picked up the story.

References

External links
Nitrogen Studios info on VFX World Map
Nitrogen Studios Canada, Inc. on Internet Movie Database
Nitrogen Studios' Vimeo
Official Twitter page

Canadian animation studios
Mass media companies established in 2003
Companies based in Vancouver
2003 establishments in Canada
2003 establishments in British Columbia